Milnthorpe is a civil parish in the South Lakeland District of Cumbria, England. It contains 13 listed buildings that are recorded in the National Heritage List for England.  All the listed buildings are designated at Grade II, the lowest of the three grades, which is applied to "buildings of national importance and special interest".  The parish contains the large village of Milnthorpe and the surrounding countryside.  The listed buildings consist of houses with associated structures, bridges, a hotel, a folly, a market cross, and a boundary post and boundary stones.


Buildings

References

Citations

Sources

Lists of listed buildings in Cumbria
Listed buildings